Gloria Williamson (born 7 December 1938) is a South African former cricketer who played as a right-arm medium bowler. She appeared in three Test matches for South Africa in 1972, all against New Zealand, taking 12 wickets. She played domestic cricket for Southern Transvaal.

References

External links
 
 

1938 births
Living people
People from Roodepoort
South African women cricketers
South Africa women Test cricketers
Central Gauteng women cricketers